Wuhan Diary is an online diary written by Chinese writer Fang Fang about the life of the people of Wuhan, China during the Wuhan lockdown during efforts to quarantine the center of an outbreak of coronavirus disease 2019 (COVID-19) and stop it spreading. An English translation of the diary, titled Wuhan Diary: Dispatches from a Quarantined City, was published in book format by HarperCollins in June 2020.

Background
During the 2020 Hubei lockdowns, her Wuhan Diary, the daily account of the locked down city's posted on social media, was widely made public. However, each post was quickly deleted by censors. Fang Fang's Weibo account, which had more than 3.8 million followers, was shut down in February. It was later reinstated. Fang Fang started the diary on 25 January 2020, two days after Wuhan was locked down. She published her 60th and what she called her final entry shortly after midnight on 25 March 2020, hours after the authorities announced that Wuhan's lockdown would end on 8 April. Fang wrote her diary from her house in Wuhan's Wuchang District, where she lives alone.

An English translation, titled Wuhan Diary: Dispatches from a Quarantined City, translated by Michael Berry, was published in book format by HarperCollins in June 2020. Berry has received angry and death threat emails for translating the diary.

Michael Berry, who started translating “Wuhan Diary” into English beginning in February 2020 said that he translated the book in order for “the world to learn from China’s experience in Wuhan”. The German version was translated by Michael Kahn-Ackermann, and was published by Hoffmann und Campe Verlag on May 30,2020.

In her Wuhan Diary, Fang Fang has called for an end of the Internet censorship in China: "Dear internet censors, you should let Wuhan people speak".

See also
 Fang Fang
 Wuhan Huanan Seafood Wholesale Market

References

2020 in China
2020 non-fiction books
Books about Wuhan
Chinese blogs
Diaries
Internet censorship in China
Books about the COVID-19 pandemic